The 2nd constituency of Vas County is one of the single member constituencies of the National Assembly, the national legislature of Hungary. The constituency standard abbreviation: Vas 02. OEVK.

Since 2014, it has been represented by Péter Ágh of the Fidesz–KDNP party alliance.

Geography
The 2nd constituency is located in northern part of Vas County.

List of municipalities
The constituency includes the following municipalities:

Members
The constituency was first represented by Péter Ágh of the Fidesz from 2014, and he was re-elected in 2018.

References

Vas 2nd